Patrick Champ (born 29 June 1954) is a retired French football defender and later manager.

References

1954 births
Living people
French footballers
Association football defenders
Nîmes Olympique players
Olympique Alès players
Ligue 1 players
Ligue 2 players
French football managers
Nîmes Olympique managers